In the Radiant City is a 2016 American drama film directed by Rachel Lambert. It was selected to be screened in the Discovery section at the 2016 Toronto International Film Festival.

Cast
 Michael Abbott Jr. as Andrew Yurley
 Marin Ireland as Laura Yurley
 Madisen Beaty as Beth Yurley
 Celia Weston as Susan Yurley
 Jon Michael Hill as Richard Gonzalez
 Chase Crawford as Corey's Friend
 Deirdre O'Connell as Woman
 Paul Sparks as Michael Yurley

References

External links
 

2016 films
2016 drama films
2016 directorial debut films
American drama films
2010s English-language films
2010s American films